Remixes of the Spheres is a collection of mixes, live versions and unreleased B-sides by former lead singer of the Stone Roses, Ian Brown. The album reworks many tracks from his third album, Music of the Spheres. UNKLE, Nightmares on Wax and Freelance Hellraiser were among the collaborators on this album.

Track listing
"F.E.A.R. (UNKLE Mix)" – 5:55
"Northern Lights (The Freelance Hellraiser Mix)" – 5:42
"The Gravy Train (N.O.W. Mix)" – 5:00
"Forever and a Day (Cedarblue Mix)" – 4:12
"Shadow of a Saint (The Boy Bierton Mix)" – 6:26
"Superstar" – 4:50
"My Star (2002)" – 4:05
"Hear No See No Speak No (Album Version)" – 5:25
"Cokane in My Brain (DJ Mek Nuremberg Scratch Mix)" – 1:45
"The Gravy Train (N.O.W. Instrumental)" – 5:07
"Stardust (Instrumental)" – 4:38
"El Mundo Pequeno (Live Acoustic Version)" – 2:48
"F.E.A.R (UNKLE Instrumental)" – 5:51

References

Ian Brown albums
2002 remix albums
Universal Records remix albums